Pentarane A, also known as D'6-pentarane or pregna-D'6-pentarane, as well as 16α,17α-cyclohexanoprogesterone, 16α,17α-tetramethylenepregn-4-ene-3,20-dione, or 17α-acetyl-16β,24-cyclo-21-norchol-4-en-3-one, is a steroidal progestin that was developed by the Zelinskii Institute of Organic Chemistry of the Russian Academy of Sciences and was never marketed. The 6α-methylated analogue of pentarane A is known as mecigestone or as pentarane B.

See also
 Acetomepregenol

References

Ketones
Pregnanes
Progestogens
Russian drugs